"Testing Times" is an episode of the BBC sitcom, The Green Green Grass. It was first screened on 15 September 2006, as the first episode of series two.

Synopsis

Boycie uses artificial fertiliser to increase the amount of crops he produces a year, but unfortunately for him his mad next door neighbour Llewellyn spots him hiding the artificial fertiliser and calls the European Union who come to inspect Boycie's farm. Boycie panics and believes he will be sent to prison, and Elgin, Bryan and Jed add to his worries when they give him a sleeping potion that results in an abnormal amount of hair loss. Can the farm staff save Boycie in time?

Episode cast

Production, broadcast and reception

Writing
This episode was written by Jim Sullivan, son of John Sullivan. The second series was written by a range of writers including John Sullivan himself.

Broadcast
During its original airing, the episode had a viewing audience of 5.04 million, in the 8:30pm timeslot it was shown. The episode made it into the top thirty of that week.

DVD release
The UK DVD release was released on 7 April 2008. The release includes the 2006 Christmas special, commentary on the first episode and a special 'The Making of...’ documentary.

References

British TV Comedy Guide for The Green Green Grass
BARB viewing figures

2006 British television episodes
The Green Green Grass episodes